Hans Arne Jensen (born 25 February 1998) is a Tongan competitive archer. Representing his nation Tonga at the 2015 World Championships and at the 2016 Summer Olympics, Jensen trained under the tutelage of his Danish father and head coach Hans Jensen.

At the 2016 Summer Olympics in Rio de Janeiro, Jensen became the first Tongan archer to compete in an Olympic tournament after 12 years, shooting only in the men's individual recurve. Jensen scored 604 points out of a possible 720 to take the sixty-first seed from a field of 64 archers in the qualifying round, before he faced his initial challenge against the eventual fourth-place finalist and world-ranked Dutch archer Sjef van den Berg, abruptly ending his Olympic debut in a dramatic 3–7 defeat.

References

External links
 

Tongan male archers
Living people
1998 births
Tongan people of Danish descent
Archers at the 2016 Summer Olympics
Olympic archers of Tonga